The  3rd Robert Awards ceremony was held in 1986 in Copenhagen, Denmark. Organized by the Danish Film Academy, the awards honoured the best in Danish and foreign film of 1985.

Honorees

Best Danish Film 
  – Anders Refn

Best Screenplay 
  -

Best Actor in a Leading Role 
 Reine Brynolfsen –

Best Actress in a Leading Role 
  –

Best Actor in a Supporting Role 
 Flemming Jørgensen –

Best Actress in a Supporting Role 
 Kirsten Olesen – Elise

Best Cinematography 
 Mikael Salomon –

Best Production Design 
 Henning Bahs –

Best Costume Design 
 Evelyn Olsson & Jette Termann –

Best Special Effects 
 Peter Høimark & Peter Klitgaard –

Best Editing 
 Kasper Schyberg –

Best Sound Design 
 Niels Arild Nielsen & Niels Bokkenheuser –

Best Score 
  -

Best Documentary Short 
  -  &

Best Foreign Film 
 False as Water – Hans Alfredson

See also 

 1986 Bodil Awards

References

External links 
  

1980s in Copenhagen
1985 film awards
1986 in Denmark
Robert Awards ceremonies